Ghatan is a market center in Beni Municipality in Myagdi District in the Dhaulagiri Zone of western-central Nepal. The former village development committee was annexed to form the new municipality on 18 May 2014. At the 2011 census, it had 1,137 households and a population of 4,327.

The village has one educational center within its boundaries.

Ghatan is located on the pilgrimage route to the Hindu sacred site Muktinath.

Ghatan is the location of the "Big Pine Forest" that was established by environmentalist Bala Badra Baniya Chhetri after fire destroyed the existing forest. The 75 hectare (185 acre) forest is managed collaboratively by the people of Ghatan village.

References

External links
UN map of the municipalities of Myagdi District

Populated places in Myagdi District